Jan Kalinowski (17 May 1857 – June 1941) was a Polish explorer and collector of biological specimens who worked in Asia and South America. He was among the first Europeans to explore the fauna of the Korean Peninsula, collecting for the museum of Count Władysław Michał Branicki of Poland from 1885 to 1888. 

A number of species described from his collections have been named after him including Kalinowski's mastiff bat (Mormopterus kalinowskii ), Kalinowski's Oldfield mouse (Thomasomys kalinowskii ), Kalinowski's agouti (Dasyprocta kalinowskii ), and Kalinowski's mouse opossum (Hyladelphys kalinowskii ).

Kalinowski was born in Okuniew where his father was a forester. He began to work for Władysław Taczanowski at the Zoological Museum in Warsaw. His first collecting expedition sponsored by Count Konstanty Branicki (1824-1884) was into Kamchatka with Benedict Dybowski. He stayed on from 1883 after Dybowski returned and explored Japan and Korea. He collected numerous insects and birds. The specimens he collected were examined and found to be new species by the Russian entomologist General Oktawiusz Radoszkowski. Kalinowski returned to Warsaw in 1888 and was tasked by Taczanowski to collect in Peru. Here he met and married Maria Villamonte settling in Peru. He set up a hacienda "La Cadena" and continued to collect specimens and sent them to museums in Europe and America. He was supported by wealthy European museum collectors including Ksawery Branicki (1864-1926) and Hans von Berlepsch.

Kalinowski died in June 1941 in Peru leaving behind his wife and eighteen children. One of his descendants was the naturalist, collector, and taxidermist Celestino Kalinowski Villamonte (1924 - 1986) who worked for the conservation and establishment of Manú National Park.

References

1857 births
1941 deaths
Deaths in Peru
People from Mińsk County
Polish explorers
Polish naturalists